is a university in Kitahiroshima, Ishikari Subprefecture, Hokkaidō, Japan.

External links
 Seisa Dohto University (English)
 Seisa Dohto University (Japanese)

Universities and colleges in Hokkaido
Private universities and colleges in Japan